Richard Hood (4 July 1769 – 20 November 1836) was an Anglican priest in Ireland during the first decades of the 19th century.

Hood was born in Queen's County (now Laois) and educated at Trinity College, Dublin. He was Rector of Gort then Dean of Kilmacduagh from 1823 until his death.

References

Alumni of Trinity College Dublin
Deans of Kilmacduagh
Church of Ireland priests
19th-century Irish Anglican priests
1823 deaths
1760 births
People from County Laois